The Europe Zone was the unique zone within Group 4 of the regional Davis Cup competition in 2019. The zone's competition was held in round robin format in San Marino, San Marino, from 15 to 20 July 2019.

Participating nations

Inactive nations

Draw
Date: 15–20 July

Location: Centro Tennis Cassa di Rispamio, San Marino, San Marino (clay)

Format: Round-robin basis.

Seeding

 1Davis Cup Rankings as of 4 February 2019

Round Robin

Pool A

Pool B 

Standings are determined by: 1. number of wins; 2. number of matches; 3. in two-team ties, head-to-head records; 4. in three-team ties, (a) percentage of sets won (head-to-head records if two teams remain tied), then (b) percentage of games won (head-to-head records if two teams remain tied), then (c) Davis Cup rankings.

Playoffs

Round Robin

Pool A

Liechtenstein vs. Armenia

Cyprus vs. Iceland

Liechtenstein vs. Albania

Cyprus vs. Armenia

Liechtenstein vs. Iceland

Armenia vs. Albania

Cyprus vs. Albania

Iceland vs. Armenia

Liechtenstein vs. Cyprus

Iceland vs. Albania

Pool B

Ireland vs. San Marino

Malta vs. Andorra

Ireland vs. Kosovo

Malta vs. San Marino

Ireland vs. Andorra

San Marino vs. Kosovo

Malta vs. Kosovo

Andorra vs. San Marino

Ireland vs. Malta

Andorra vs. Kosovo

Playoffs

1st to 2nd playoff

Cyprus vs. Ireland

3rd to 4th playoff

Liechtenstein vs. Malta

5th to 6th playoff

Iceland vs. San Marino

7th to 8th playoff

Armenia vs. Kosovo

9th to 10th playoff

Albania vs. Andorra

References

External links
Official Website

Europe Zone Group IV
Davis Cup Europe/Africa Zone